Nonius can refer to:

People
 Romans belonging to the Nonia gens
 Pedro Nunes (Latin: Petrus Nonius) (1502–1578), Portuguese astronomer and mathematician

Other
 Nonius (horse), a breed of horse
 Nonius (device), a precursor to the Vernier scale
 Nonius (crater), a lunar crater

See also
 Nonus
 Nonnus